Loyola  is a census-designated place in Santa Clara County, California, United States. The population was 3,491 at the 2020 census. The woodsy area is located between the cities of Los Altos and Los Altos Hills. It is the home of Facebook's first headquarters. Homes in the area range from cottages to mansions. It is named for Ignatius of Loyola, a Spanish saint and founder of the Jesuits.

History
The name comes from a 1904 plan by the Jesuits of Santa Clara University to build a new university named for their founder, St. Ignatius of Loyola, in the area. If the plan had come to fruition, the university would have been located in the area of the present-day golf course on Country Club Drive. The Loyola project succumbed to delays and financing problems stemming from the 1906 San Francisco earthquake.

Geography
Loyola is located at  (37.351391, -122.100526).

Demographics

2010
The 2010 United States Census reported that Loyola had a population of 3,261. The racial makeup of Loyola was 2,291 (70.3%) White, 19 (0.6%) African American, 1 (0.0%) Native American, 760 (23.3%) Asian, 2 (0.1%) Pacific Islander, 37 (1.1%) from other races, and 151 (4.6%) from two or more races. Hispanic or Latino of any race were 114 persons (3.5%).

The Census reported that 100% of the population lived in households.

There were 1,163 households, out of which 446 (38.3%) had children under the age of 18 living in them, 877 (75.4%) were opposite-sex married couples living together, 52 (4.5%) had a female householder with no husband present, 27 (2.3%) had a male householder with no wife present.  There were 30 (2.6%) unmarried opposite-sex partnerships, and 15 (1.3%) same-sex married couples or partnerships. 160 households (13.8%) were made up of individuals, and 95 (8.2%) had someone living alone who was 65 years of age or older. The average household size was 2.80.  There were 956 families (82.2% of all households); the average family size was 3.06.

The population was spread out, with 811 people (24.9%) under the age of 18, 133 people (4.1%) aged 18 to 24, 560 people (17.2%) aged 25 to 44, 1,107 people (33.9%) aged 45 to 64, and 650 people (19.9%) who were 65 years of age or older.  The median age was 47.5 years. For every 100 females, there were 97.4 males.  For every 100 females age 18 and over, there were 94.3 males.

The homeowner vacancy rate was 1.0%; the rental vacancy rate was 4.4%.  2,954 people (90.6% of the population) lived in owner-occupied housing units and 307 people (9.4%) lived in rental housing units.

2000

As of the census of 2000, there were 3,478 people, 1,275 households, and 1,039 families residing in the CDP. The racial makeup of the CDP was 79.13% White, 0.35% African American, 0.14% Native American, 15.93% Asian, 0.06% Pacific Islander, 1.09% from other races, and 3.31% from two or more races. Hispanic or Latino of any race were 3.91% of the population.

There were 1,275 households, out of which 33.8% had children under the age of 18 living with them, 74.4% were married couples living together, 4.9% had a female householder with no husband present, and 18.5% were non-families. 14.0% of all households were made up of individuals, and 7.8% had someone living alone who was 65 years of age or older.  The average household size was 2.73 and the average family size was 2.97.

In the CDP, the population was spread out, with 23.1% under the age of 18, 3.8% from 18 to 24, 22.5% from 25 to 44, 34.3% from 45 to 64, and 16.3% who were 65 years of age or older.  The median age was 45 years. For every 100 females, there were 94.8 males.  For every 100 females age 18 and over, there were 93.6 males.

The median income for a household in the CDP was $140,617, and the median income for a family was $149,379. Males had a median income of $100,001 versus $69,306 for females. The per capita income for the CDP was $68,730.  None of the families and 0.8% of the population were living below the poverty line, including no under eighteens and none of those over 64.

Government

Education
The Loyola CDP is served by the Los Altos School District (K-8) and Mountain View-Los Altos Union High School District (9-12).

References

Census-designated places in Santa Clara County, California
Unincorporated communities in California
Census-designated places in California
Unincorporated communities in Santa Clara County, California